Lakshaprabhu is a 1968 Indian Malayalam-language film, directed by P. Bhaskaran and produced by Raveendranathan Nair. The film stars Prem Nazir, Sheela, Sukumari and Adoor Bhasi. The film had musical score by M. S. Baburaj.

Plot

Cast 

Prem Nazir
Sheela
Sukumari
Adoor Bhasi
Manavalan Joseph
Pattom Sadan
P. J. Antony
P. K. Nair
Sankaradi
Bhadran
Bahadoor
G. K. Pillai
Jayanthi
K. P. Ummer
Khadeeja
Master Ayyappan
Master Sathyan
Meena
K. S. Parvathy
Panicker
Prathapan
Ravikumar
Johnson
Padmakumar

Soundtrack 
The music was composed by M. S. Baburaj and the lyrics were written by P. Bhaskaran.

References

External links 
 

1960s Malayalam-language films
1968 films
Films directed by P. Bhaskaran